In the run-up to the next Danish general election, various organisations will carry out opinion polling to gauge voting intentions in Denmark. Results of such polls are displayed in this list.

The date range for these opinion polls are from the 2022 Danish general election, held on 1 November, to the present day. The Constitution of Denmark specifies that the next election must be held no later than four years after the previous election.

Opinion polls

2023

2022

Notes

See also 
Opinion polling for the 2022 Danish general election
Opinion polling for the 2019 Danish general election

References 

Next
Denmark